Steven C. Wofsy is an American atmosphere and hydrospheric scientist currently Abbott Lawrence Rotch Professor of Atmospheric and Environmental Science at Harvard University and an Elected Fellow of the American Association for the Advancement of Science. Awarded the Roger Revelle Medal in 2012.

References

Year of birth missing (living people)
Living people
Fellows of the American Association for the Advancement of Science
American geophysicists
Harvard University faculty
Place of birth missing (living people)